Francis Okaroh  (born August 25, 1963 in Enugu, Nigeria) is a retired Nigerian football (soccer) defender. Playing professionally in the United States, he began his career indoors with the Cleveland Force in 1987–88 before spending five seasons in Major League Soccer (MLS) with the New England Revolution (1996–1997), Chicago Fire (1998–1999) and Miami Fusion (2000). He was a starting defender in the inaugural campaigns for both the Revolution and Fire, winning MLS Cup '98 with the latter. He has been an assistant coach with the men's soccer program at his alma mater Boston University since 2007.

Player

College
Okaroh played college soccer in the United States at Boston University (BU) from 1982 to 1986. He was a 1986 Second Team All American. He was inducted into the BU Athletic Hall of Fame in 2006.

Professional
In November 1987, Okaroh signed with the Cleveland Force of Major Indoor Soccer League. He played only one season with the Force. In 1995, Okaroh played for the amateur Lowell Blues of the Luso-American Soccer Association. In 1996, in preparation for the upcoming Major League Soccer season, Okaroh signed with the Cape Cod Crusaders of the USISL. In July 1996, Okaroh was called up to the Major League Soccer's New England Revolution and played there for two years, until he was taken by the Chicago Fire in the 1997 MLS Expansion Draft. During his time with the Revolution, he earned defender of the year awards in 1997 and 1998. He then helped the Fire to the 1998 MLS Cup and US Open Cup double. In 2000, he was traded to the Miami Fusion and spent a season there before a trade to the MetroStars. He never played for the latter club, and was waived before the 2001 season.

Coach
In the early 1990s, Okaroh coached the Norwood High School boys' soccer team. Currently, he runs Francis Okaroh's Ultimate Soccer Academy in New Hampton, New Hampshire. In 2007, he became an assistant coach with the Boston University men's soccer team. With his brother Ben, he founded FC Blazers, a youth soccer club based in Massachusetts.

References

External links
 Francis Okaroh's Ultimate Soccer Academy
 
 MISL: Francis Okaroh

1963 births
Living people
Boston University alumni
Boston University Terriers men's soccer players
Cape Cod Crusaders players
Chicago Fire FC players
Cleveland Force (original MISL) players
Major Indoor Soccer League (1978–1992) players
Major League Soccer players
Miami Fusion players
New England Revolution players
Nigerian footballers
Nigerian expatriate footballers
Expatriate soccer players in the United States
Nigerian expatriate sportspeople in the United States
USISL players
Footballers from Enugu
Association football defenders